The Vanil de l'Ecri is a mountain of the Swiss Prealps, located on the border between the cantons of Fribourg and Vaud. Reaching a height of 2,376 metres above sea level, it is both the second highest summit of the Vanil Noir massif and the canton of Fribourg. The mountain lies between the Pointe de Paray and the Vanil Noir.

The closest localities are Grandvillard (Fribourg) and Château d'Oex (Vaud).

References

External links
Vanil de l'Ecri on Hikr

Mountains of the canton of Vaud
Mountains of the canton of Fribourg
Mountains of the Alps
Fribourg–Vaud border
Mountains of Switzerland
Two-thousanders of Switzerland